The Atlantic royal flycatcher (Onychorhynchus swainsoni) is a passerine bird in the family Tityridae according to the International Ornithological Committee (IOC). It is endemic to Brazil.

Taxonomy and systematics

The IOC considers the Atlantic royal flycatcher and three other royal flycatcher taxa to be separate species and places them in the family Tityridae. The South American Classification Committee of the American Ornithological Society (SACC-AOS) and the Clements taxonomy consider the four to be subspecies of the widespread royal flycatcher (Onychorhynchus coronatus sensu lato). SACC-AOS places O. coronatus in family Onychorhynchidae and includes four other flycatcher species in that family. Clements places it in family Oxyruncidae and includes those four, one other flycatcher, and the sharpbill. IOC considers all of them to be in Tityridae.

The Atlantic royal flycatcher is monotypic.

Description

This large-billed flycatcher has a spectacular, but rarely seen, crest. The upper parts are mostly dull brown with a bright cinnamon rump and tail. It has a whitish throat and ochraceous buff underparts. It has an erectile fan-shaped crest that when raised is scarlet, black, and blue in the male and yellow, black, and blue in the female.

Distribution and habitat

The Atlantic royal flycatcher is found only in the Atlantic forest of southeastern Brazil, from Bahia State south to northern Santa Catarina State. It inhabits humid lowlands, both primary evergreen and second growth forests. It is a bird of the midstory.

Behavior

Feeding

All of the royal flycatchers are insectivorous.

Breeding

The Atlantic royal flycatcher's nest is long and narrow and is suspended from a branch or vine, usually above water. The clutch is two eggs; only the female incubates them and broods and feeds the nestlings. Breeding appears to be in the austral spring, because nest-building was recorded in October and eggs were laid in November. In another area, a juvenile was seen in January.

Vocalization

The Atlantic royal flycatcher is usually inconspicuous and quiet. Its song is  "a descending, slowing series of plaintive whistles"  and its call a repeated "keeeyup or keee-yew" .

Status

The IUCN has assessed the Atlantic royal flycatcher as being Vulnerable. "The species has recently been discovered at a number of new locations; however, the population is estimated at 600-1,700 mature individuals and declining rapidly."

References

External links
 
 
 
 
 

Onychorhynchus
Birds of the Atlantic Forest
Endemic birds of Brazil
Birds described in 1858
Taxonomy articles created by Polbot